The Championship Course is a stretch of the River Thames between Mortlake and Putney in London, England. It is a well-established course for rowing races, particularly the Oxford and Cambridge Boat Race. The course is on the tidal reaches of the river often referred to as the Tideway. Due to the iconic shape of the Championship Course, in orthopaedic surgery, an "S" shaped incision along the crease of the elbow is commonly referred to as "a boat-race incision resembling the River Thames from Putney to Mortlake."

History
In 1845, it was agreed to stage the Boat Race (which had on five previous occasions been rowed from Westminster Bridge to Putney) on a course from 'Putney Bridge to Mortlake Church tower'. The aim was to reduce the interference from heavy river traffic.

The following year, a race for the Professional World Sculling Championship moved to the course for the first time. The Wingfield Sculls followed in 1861.

The course was later defined by two stones on the southern bank of the river, marked "U.B.R." for University Boat Race: one just downstream of Chiswick Bridge, close to The Ship public house, and the other just upstream of Putney Bridge. The course distance is 4 miles and 374 yards, as measured along the centre of the river's stream.

Races are always rowed in the same direction as the tide: from Mortlake to Putney on an ebb tide or from Putney to Mortlake on a flood tide.

Since the Boat Race moved to this course in 1845, it has always been raced on a flood tide from Putney to Mortlake except in 1846, 1856 and 1863. The Wingfield Sculls is also raced from Putney to Mortlake. Most other events race on an ebb tide from Mortlake to Putney.

In April 1869, the Harvard University Boat Club challenged the Oxford University Boat Club to an "International University Boat-Race" of coxed fours on the Boat Race course. The race took place on 27 August 1869 and was narrowly won by Oxford. The new Atlantic cable allowed daily reports to be received by all major newspapers across America within 23 minutes of the finish. U.S. public interest in the event was huge, with more publicity than any sporting event to date, and within two years of the event the "newly awakened interest in rowing at many of the most noted seats of learning" doubled the number of boat clubs in the US, and led to the formation of the Rowing Association of American Colleges.

Landmarks
Principal landmarks, often used when racing, include (in order from Mortlake to Putney):

Events
Boustead Cup (February/March)
Women's Eights Head of the River Race (March)
Schools' Head of the River Race (March)
Head of the River Race (March/April)
Veterans Head (March)
The Boat Races – The Boat Race, Women's Boat Race and The Lightweight Boat Races (March/April)
Wingfield Sculls (October/November)
Pairs Head of the River (rowed as far as Harrods)  (October)
Head of the River Fours (November)
Veteran Fours Head of the River (November)
Scullers Head (November/December)

Rowing clubs along the course

Tideway Scullers School
Thames Tradesmen's Rowing Club
Emanuel School Boat Club
Cygnet Rowing Club
Barnes Bridge Ladies Rowing Club
Sons of the Thames Rowing Club
Latymer Upper School Boat Club
Furnivall Sculling Club
St Pauls School Boat Club
Auriol Kensington Rowing Club
Nautilus Rowing Club (British Rowing headquarters)
Fulham Reach Boat Club
Barn Elms Rowing Club
Parr’s Priory Rowing Club
Imperial College Boat Club
Thames Rowing Club
Vesta Rowing Club
Crabtree Boat Club
King's College School Boat Club
Dulwich College Boat Club
Westminster School Boat Club
HSBC Rowing Club
London Rowing Club
Putney High School Boat Club
The London Oratory School Boat Club

See also
Rowing on the River Thames
University Boat Race Stones

References

External links
The Port of London Rowing Chart includes a map of the course showing detailed rules for rowers, the deep water channel, local rowing clubs and other landmarks.

The Boat Race
Mortlake, London
Rowing on the River Thames
Rowing venues in the United Kingdom
Sports venues in London